Somsak Jaikaew (5 January 1959 – 28 August 2021) was an Thai politician.

From 2011 to 2019, he served as a member of the House of Representatives of Thailand representing the Pheu Thai Party.

Jaikaew died from COVID-19 in 2021, aged 62.

References 

1936 births
2021 deaths
Somsak Jaikaew
Deaths from the COVID-19 pandemic in Thailand
Somsak Jaikaew